Darrell Lynn Judge (November 2, 1934, Albion, Illinois – August 26, 2014, Temecula, California) was an American physicist, known for his research in solar physics, spectroscopy, and space science.

Biography
His father was Virgil H. Judge, the first president of Lake Land College in Mattoon, Illinois. Darrell L. Judge graduated from Edwards County High School in 1952. He received in 1956 a B.S. with a joint major in physics and mathematics from Eastern Illinois State College (renamed in 1957 Eastern Illinois University). At the University of Southern California (USC) he graduated in physics with an M.A. in 1963 and a Ph.D. in 1965. After receiving his Ph.D. he joined the USC faculty in the department of physics and astronomy. He became a full professor in 1975 and retired from USC in 2013 as professor emeritus. In 1978 he was the founding director of USC's Space Sciences Center (SSC) and continued as the SSC's director until his retirement in 2013. The present director of the SSC is Leonid Didkovsky.

Judge did research on "space exploration, atomic and molecular physics, ultraviolet imaging, deep space and sounding rockets, and star systems." He and his colleagues designed and built various instruments used onboard NASA space flight missions. Such instruments were used to monitor  electromagnetic radiation from the infrared to the extreme ultraviolet. The instruments were essential for experiments flown on the Pioneer 10 and 11 space probes and the SOHO (Solar and Heliospheric Observatory) spacecraft.

Darrell Judge received in 1974 the NASA Exceptional Scientific Achievement Award and in 1991 the von Humboldt U.S. Senior Scientist Award.
He was elected in 1996 a fellow of the American Physical Society for "his pioneering work on the fundamental properties of atoms and molecules using selected monochromatic photon excitation and dispersed fluorescence, and their applications in space physics."

He married Marjorie Sanders Waddell in June 1959 in Brevard County, Florida. They met at Cape Canaveral, where both were employed by the Ramo-Wooldridge Corporation (which became TRW Inc. in July 1965).

Upon his death, he was survived by his widow, two daughters, a son, and five grandchildren.

Selected publications

References

1934 births
2014 deaths
20th-century American physicists
21st-century American physicists
American astrophysicists
Space scientists
Eastern Illinois University alumni
University of Southern California alumni
University of Southern California faculty
Fellows of the American Physical Society
People from Albion, Illinois